Los Guerrilleros is a 1963 Spanish motion picture.  The film was directed by Pedro Luis Ramírez, and stars Manolo Escobar, Rocío Jurado, Alfredo Mayo,  and Gracita Morales.

Plot
After the sacking of Córdoba, the troops of Napoleon's army, under the command of Colonel Tenardier, went to Andújar to join General Dupont and give the final battle to the few Spanish patriots that General Castaños has been able to gather. In 1808, in some towns of Spain, guerrilla groups formed attacking the French. In Montoro (Córdoba) they manage to annihilate, in a heroic battle, fought in the town square itself, the troops of Colonel Tenardier.

Cast
 José Cuadros
 Rafael Durán
 Manolo Escobar
 Manolo Gómez Bur
 Pilar Gómez Ferrer
 Manuel Guitart
 Rocío Jurado
 Paula Martel
 Daniel Martín
 Alfredo Mayo
 Gracita Morales

External links

1963 films
Spanish historical drama films
Guerrilla warfare in film
1960s Spanish films